This is an alphabetical list of fungal taxa as recorded from South Africa. Currently accepted names have been appended.

Ec
Genus: Echidnodella Theiss. & Syd. 1918
Echidnodella hypolepidis Doidge 1920accepted as Echidnodes hypolepidis (Doidge) Doidge, (1942)
Echidnodella natalensis (Doidge) Arx, (1962), recorded as Echidnodes natalensis (Doidge) Doidge 1942

Genus: Echidnodes Theiss. & Syd. 1918
Echidnodes acokantherae (Doidge) Doidge 1942, accepted as Lembosina acokantherae (Doidge) Arx [as 'acocantherae'],(1962)
Echidnodes africana (Doidge) Doidge 1942
Echidnodes curtisiae  Doidge 1948
Echidnodes durbana (Van der Byl) Hansf. 1946 accepted as Lembosina durbana (Van der Byl) Arx, (1962)
Echidnodes hypolepidis (Doidge) Doidge 1942
Echidnodes natalensis (Doidge) Doidge 1942 accepted as Echidnodella natalensis (Doidge) Arx, (1962)
Echidnodes rhoina Doidge 1920 accepted as Lembosina rhoina (Doidge) Arx, (1962)
Echidnodes transvaalensis Doidge 1948

Genus: Ectotrichophyton Castell. & Chalm. 1919 accepted as Trichophyton Malmsten, (1848)
Ectotrichophyton mentagrophytes (C.P. Robin) Castell. & Chalm. 1919 accepted as Trichophyton mentagrophytes (C.P. Robin) Sabour., (1895)

El
Genus: Elmerococcum Theiss. & Syd. 1915, accepted as Botryosphaeria Ces. & De Not., (1863)
Elmerococcum peglerae (Pole-Evans) Doidge 1921

Genus: Elsinoë Racib. 1900
Elsinoë ampelina Shear 1929
Elsinoë fawcetti Bitanc. & Jenkins 1936
Elsinoë poinsettiae Jenkins (sic) possibly (Jenkins & Ruehle) Rossman & W.C. Allen 2016
Elsinoë pyri (Woron.) Jenkins 1932
Elsinoë violae Jenkins (sic) probably (Massey & Jenkins) X.L. Fan & Crous 2017

Em
Genus: Empusa Cohn 1855
Empusa conglomerata (Sorokīn) Thaxt. 1888 accepted as Entomophaga conglomerata (Sorokīn) S. Keller,  [1987]
Empusa fresenii Nowak. 1886 accepted as Neozygites fresenii (Nowak.) Remaud. & S. Keller, (1980)
Empusa grylli (Fresen.) Nowak. 1888 accepted as Entomophaga grylli (Fresen.) A. Batko, (1964)
Empusa lecanii Zimm. 1901 accepted as Neozygites lecanii (Zimm.) Ben Ze'ev & R.G. Kenneth, (1987)
Empusa muscae Cohn 1855 accepted as Entomophthora muscae (Cohn) Fresen., (1856)
Empusa sp.

En
Genus: Endocarpiscum Nyl. 1864 (Lichens)
Endocarpiscum guepini (Delise) Nyl. 1864

Genus: Endocarpon Hedw. 1789
Endocarpon crenatum Taylor 1847 accepted as Psora crenata (Taylor) Reinke, (1895)
Endocarpon hepaticum Ach. 1809
Endocarpon peltatum Taylor 1847
Endocarpon pusillum Hedw. 1789
Endocarpon speireum Taylor 1847
Endocarpon vitellinum Spreng. 1820
Endocarpon thunbergii (Ach.) Ach. 1803 accepted as Dermatiscum thunbergii (Ach.) Nyl., (1867)

Genus: Endodermophyton Castell. 1910 accepted as Trichophyton Malmsten, (1848)
Endodermophyton africanum Doidge (sic) possibly C.W. Dodge 1935
Endodermophyton sp.

Genus: Endodothella Theiss. & Syd. 1915 accepted as Phyllachora Nitschke ex Fuckel, (1870) 
Endodothella deightonii Syd. 1938 accepted as Stigmochora deightonii (Syd.) Arx, (1962)
Endodothella natalensis Doidge 1921 accepted as Stigmochora natalensis (Doidge) Arx, (1962)
Endodothella strelitziae (Cooke) Theiss. & Syd. 1915 accepted as Phyllachora strelitziae (Cooke) Sacc., (1883)

Order: Endomycetales Gäum. & C.W. Dodge 1928

Family: Endomycetaceae J. Schröt. 1893

Genus: Endophyllum Lév. 1826
Endophyllum macowanii Pole-Evans 1909 [as macowani]

Genus: Endopyrenium Flot. 1855 accepted as Catapyrenium Flot., (1850)
Endopyrenium peltatum (Taylor) Müll. Arg. 1888

Genus: Englerula Henn. 1904
Englerula macarangae Henn. 1904
Englerula popowiae Stevens.*

Genus: Englerulaster Höhn. 1910 accepted as Asterina Lév., (1845)
Englerulaster gymnosporiae (Henn.) Theiss. 1918 accepted as Englera gymnosporiae (Henn.) F. Stevens,  (1939)
Englerulaster macowanianus (Thüm.) G. Arnaud 1918 accepted as Parenglerula macowaniana (Thüm.) Höhn.,  (1910)
Englerulaster orbicularis (Berk. & M.A. Curtis) Höhn. 1910 accepted as Cryptomeliola orbicularis (Berk. & M.A. Curtis) S. Hughes & Piroz., (1997)
Englerulaster popowiae Doidge 1920 accepted as Englera popowiae (Doidge) F. Stevens, (1939)

Genus: Enterographa Fée 1825 (Lichens)
Enterographa capensis A. Massal. 1861, accepted as Chiodecton colensoi (A. Massal.) Müll. Arg., (1894)
Enterographa galactina (Zahlbr.) Redinger 1938
Enterographa vanderbylii (Zahlbr.) Redinger 1938
Enterographa venosa (Pers.) A. Massal. 1860 accepted as Enterographa crassa (DC.) Fée, [1824]

Genus: Enterostigma Müll. Arg. 1885 accepted as Thelotrema Ach., (1803)
Enterostigma compunctum (Ach.) Müll. Arg. 1885 accepted as Leucodecton compunctum (Ach.) A. Massal., [1859-1860]

Genus: Entoloma P. Kumm. 1871
Entoloma erophilum (Fr.) P. Karst. 1879, accepted as Entoloma plebejum (Kalchbr.) Noordel., (1985)
Entoloma lividum Quél. 1872 accepted as Entoloma sinuatum (Bull.) P. Kumm., (1871)
Entoloma microcarpum (Berk. & Broome) Sacc. 1887 accepted as Termitomyces microcarpus (Berk. & Broome) R. Heim, (1942)
Entoloma sagittiforme (Kalchbr. & Cooke) Sacc. [as 'sagittaeforme'] 1887, accepted as Termitomyces sagittiformis (Kalchbr. & Cooke) D.A. Reid [as 'sagittaeformis'], (1975)

Genus Entomophaga A. Batko 1964,
Entomophaga conglomerata (Sorokīn) S. Keller,  [1987] recorded as Empusa conglomerata (Sorokīn) Thaxt. 1888
Entomophaga grylli (Fresen.) A. Batko, (1964) recorded as Empusa grylli (Fresen.) Nowak. 1888

Genus: Entomophthora Fresen. 1856
Entomophthora aphidis H. Hoffm. 1858, accepted as Zoophthora aphidis (H. Hoffm.) A. Batko, (1964)
Entomophthora apiculata (Thaxt.) M.A. Gust. 1965 accepted as Batkoa apiculata (Thaxt.) Humber, (1989)
Entomophthora coronata (Costantin) Kevorkian 1937 accspted as Conidiobolus coronatus (Costantin) A. Batko, (1964) [1962]
Entomophthora grylli Fresen. 1856
Entomophthora megasperma (Cohn) Sacc. 1888 accepted as Tarichium megaspermum Cohn, (1875)
Entomophthora muscae (Cohn) Fresen., (1856) recorded as Empusa muscae Cohn 1855
Entomophthora sphaerosperma Fresen. 1856
Entomophthora sp.

Order: Entomophthorales G. Winter 1880

Family: Entomophthoraceae A.B. Frank 1874

Genus: EntomosporiumcLév. 1857 accepted as Diplocarpon F.A. Wolf, (1912)
Entomosporium maculatum Lév. 1856 accepted as Diplocarpon mespili (Sorauer) B. Sutton, (1980)

Genus: Entopeltis Höhn. 1910 accepted as Vizella Sacc., (1883)
Entopeltis interrupta (G. Winter) Höhn. 1910, accepted as Vizella interrupta (G. Winter) S. Hughes, (1953)

Genus: Entyloma  de Bary 1874
Entyloma australe Speg. 1880
Entyloma bidentis Henn. 1895
Entyloma calendulae (Oudem.) de Bary 1874
Entyloma dahliae Syd. & P. Syd. 1912
Entyloma fuscum J. Schröt. 1877
Entyloma oleandrae Henn. 1895
Entyloma physalidis (Kalchbr. & Cooke) G. Winter 1883 accepted as Entyloma australe Speg., (1880)
Entyloma zinniae Syd. 1935

Ep
Family: Ephebaceae Th. Fr. 1861

Genus: Ephebe Fr. 1825
Ephebe lanata (L.) Vain. 1888
Ephebe pubescens (L.) Fr. 1826,  accepted as Pseudephebe pubescens (L.) M. Choisy, (1930)

Genus: Ephelis Fr. 1849
Ephelis viridans (Kalchbr. & Cooke) Sacc. 1884

Genus: Epichloë (Fr.) Tul. & C. Tul. 1865
Epichloë cinerea Berk. & Broome 1873
Epichloë eragrostis (sic) Pole Evans probably Epichloe eragrostidis Pole-Evans, (1917)
Epichloë zahlbruckneriana Henn. 1900

Genus: Epicoccum Link 1816
Epicoccum chrysanthemi du Plessis 1933
Epicoccum granulatum Penz. 1882
Epicoccum humicola (R.E. Buchanan) Sacc. 1931
Epicoccum neglectum Desm. 1842
Epicoccum nigrum Link 1816
Epicoccum purpurascens Ehrenb. ex Schltdl. 1824 accepted as Epicoccum nigrum (1816)
Epicoccum sp.

Genus: Epidermophyton Sabour. 1907
Epidermophyton floccosum (Harz) Langeron & Miloch. 1930
Epidermophyton interdigitale (Priestley) L. MacCarthy 1925 accepted as Trichophyton mentagrophytes (C.P. Robin) Sabour., (1895)
Epidermophyton purpureum (H. Bang) C.W. Dodge 1935 accepted as Trichophyton purpureum H. Bang,  (1910)
Epidermophyton rubrum Castell. 1910 accepted as Trichophyton rubrum (Castell.) Sabour., (1911)

Genus: Epistigme Syd. 1924
Epistigme nidulans Syd. 1924

Genus: Epochnium Link 1809 accepted as Monilinia Honey, (1928)
Epochnium phyllogenum Kalchbr. & Cooke 1880

Er
Family: Eremascaceae Engl. & E. Gilg 1924

Eremascaceae imperfectae C.W. Dodge 1935

Genus: Erikssonia Penz. & Sacc. 1898
Erikssonia carissae Doidge 1948

Genus: Eriomycopsis Speg. 1910
Eriomycopsis asterinae Hansf. 1942 accepted as Atractilina asterinae (Hansf.) Deighton & Piroz., (1972)
Eriomycopsis bomplandi Speg. 1910
Eriomycopsis flagellata Hansf. 1942
Eriomycopsis meliolae Hansf. 1942
Eriomycopsis minima Hansf. 1942 accepted as Rhytidenglerula minima (Hansf.) Arx, (1962)
Eriomycopsis ugandae Hansf. 1942

Genus: Erostella (Sacc.) Sacc. 1906 accepted as Phaeoacremonium W. Gams, Crous & M.J. Wingf., (1996)
Erostella quaternarioides Sacc.*

Family: Erysiphaceae Tul. & C. Tul. 1861

Genus: Erysiphe R. Hedw. ex DC. 1805
Erysiphe aquilegiae DC. 1815
Erysiphe brachystegiae  Doidge 1948
Erysiphe cichoracearum  DC. 1805
Erysiphe communis Link. (sic) possibly (Wallr.) Schltdl. 1824 accepted as Erysiphe cruciferarum Opiz ex L. Junell, (1967)
Erysiphe cruciferarum Opiz ex L. Junell, (1967) recorded as Erysiphe communis Link. (sic) possibly (Wallr.) Schltdl. 1824
Erysiphe graminis DC. 1815 accepted as Blumeria graminis (DC.) Speer, (1975) 
Erysiphe heraclei DC., (1815) recorded as Erysiphe umbelliferarum (Lév.) de Bary 1870,
Erysiphe jatrophae Doidge 1948,
Erysiphe martii Lév. 1851 accepted as Erysiphe trifolii Grev., (1824)
Erysiphe nitida (Wallr.) Rabenh. 1844
Erysiphe pisi DC. 1805
Erysiphe polygoni DC. 1805
Erysiphe trifolii Grev., (1824) recorded as Erysiphe martii Lév. 1851
Erysiphe umbelliferarum (Lév.) de Bary 1870, accepted as Erysiphe heraclei DC., (1815)

Eu
Subclass: Eubasidii*

Genus: EubelonisClem., (1909) accepted as Calycina Nees ex Gray, (1821)
Eubelonis ocoteae Van der Byl 1926

Genus: Eucantharomyces Thaxt. 1895
Eucantharomyces africanus Thaxt. 1900

Genus: Eudarluca Speg. 1908
Eudarluca australis Speg. 1908

Genus: Eudimeriolum Speg. 1912
Eudimeriolum gymnosporiae Hansf. 1946, accepted as Episphaerella gymnosporiae (Hansf.) Arx, (1962)

Genus: Eumitra*
Eumitra implicita Stirt.*

Genus: Eupelte Syd. 1924
Eupelte amicta Syd. 1924

Family: Eurotiaceae Clem. & Shear 1931

Genus: Eurotium Link 1809
Eurotium herbariorum (Weber ex F.H. Wigg.) Link ex Nees 1816, accepted as Aspergillus glaucus (L.) Link, (1809)

Genus: Euryachora Fuckel 1870
Euryachora maculiformis E.E. Nel 1942

Genus: Eutypella  (Nitschke) Sacc. 1875
Eutypella acacia Doidge 1941
Eutypella citricola Syd. & P. Syd. 1909
Eutypella doidgeae Syd. 1939
Eutypella lycii Doidge 1941 accepted as Eutypella capensis Rappaz, (1987)
Eutypella macowani Doidge 1941
Eutypella stellulata (Fr.) Sacc. 1882

Ev
Genus: Evernia Ach. 1809 (Lichens)
Evernia chrysophthalma Flotow.*
Evernia flavicans (Sw.) Fr. 1831 accepted as Teloschistes flavicans (Sw.) Norman, (1852)
Evernia flavicans var. dealbata Flot. 1843

Ex
Genus: Exidia Fr. 1822
Exidia auricula-judae (Bull.) Fr. 1822 accepted as Auricularia auricula-judae (Bull.) Quél., (1886)
Exidia caespitosa Lloyd 1915
Exidia duthiei Lloyd 1915
Exidia purpurea-cinerea MacOwan & Kalchbr. (sic)possibly Exidia purpureocinerea MacOwan 1882

Genus: Exoascus Fuckel 1860
Exoascus deformans (Berk.) Fuckel 1870 accepted as Taphrina deformans (Berk.) Tul., (1866)

Family: Exobasidiaceae J. Schröt. 1888

Genus: Exobasidium Woronin 1867
Exobasidium giseckiae Allesch. 1895
Exobasidium hesperidum Maire 1917, [as hesperidium] accepted as Muribasidiospora hesperidum (Maire) Kamat & Rajendren, (1968)
Exobasidium vaccinii (Fuckel) Woronin 1867
Exobasidium vitis (Viala & G. Boyer) Prill. & Delacr. 1894 accepted as Aureobasidium pullulans (de Bary & Löwenthal) G. Arnaud, (1918)

Genus: Exosporium Link 1809
Exosporium celastri Kalchbr. 1880 accepted as Stigmina celastri (Kalchbr.) M.B. Ellis, (1959)
Exosporium palmivorum Sacc. 1898, accepted as Scolecostigmina palmivora (Sacc.) Kamal, (2010)

See also
 List of bacteria of South Africa
 List of Oomycetes of South Africa
 List of slime moulds of South Africa

 List of fungi of South Africa
 List of fungi of South Africa – A
 List of fungi of South Africa – B
 List of fungi of South Africa – C
 List of fungi of South Africa – D
 List of fungi of South Africa – E
 List of fungi of South Africa – F
 List of fungi of South Africa – G
 List of fungi of South Africa – H
 List of fungi of South Africa – I
 List of fungi of South Africa – J
 List of fungi of South Africa – K
 List of fungi of South Africa – L
 List of fungi of South Africa – M
 List of fungi of South Africa – N
 List of fungi of South Africa – O
 List of fungi of South Africa – P
 List of fungi of South Africa – Q
 List of fungi of South Africa – R
 List of fungi of South Africa – S
 List of fungi of South Africa – T
 List of fungi of South Africa – U
 List of fungi of South Africa – V
 List of fungi of South Africa – W
 List of fungi of South Africa – X
 List of fungi of South Africa – Y
 List of fungi of South Africa – Z

References

Sources

Further reading
 

Fungi
South African biodiversity lists
South Africa